The Defeated, also known as Shadowplay, is a 2020 television series.

Plot 
New York Police Department Detective Max McLaughlin gets assigned to post-World War II Berlin by the United States Department of State to help organize and establish a new police force and at the same time, looks for his brother, Moritz, a United States Army soldier who went missing at the end of the war, and helps Elsie Garten, a novice female German police superintendent, to fight crime in 1946 Germany.

The two lead characters, brothers Max and Moritz McLaughlin, are named after German literary characters Max and Moritz, from a 19th century illustrated children's book, Max and Moritz: A Story of Seven Boyish Pranks. The book also features prominently throughout the series.

Episodes  
Season 1
1. First Trick
Max McLaughlin, a Detective with the New York Police Department, is sent to Berlin by the United States Department of State in 1946 to help German police superintendent Elsie Garten establish a new police department after World War II in the hopes of finding his brother, Moritz, a United States Army soldier who is thought to have died.
2. Brother of Edmund
Vice-consul Tom Franklin, Max's boss, puts pressure on him to investigate and crack the murder case of two American GIs as soon as possible, and Max and Elsie question Karin.
3. Rainbows
An auxiliary police officer has discovered where Karin is, but she manages to flee to the "Angel Maker", a German crime boss and abortionist; Max does not find Moritz himself, but at least he will find his sanctuary and discovers he is holed up in a boathouse.
4. Nakam
Moritz discovers crucial documents in high-ranking Nazi officer Otto Oberlander's home; Tom's wife Claire helps Max in his investigation; Claire discovers that her husband is collaborating with the Nazis; and Max and Moritz disagree about what should happen to Franklin.
5. Bellyful
When Max and Elsie's unit locates Karin once more and pursues a contentious line of questioning, the investigation in Berlin goes on.
6. Blessed
Elsie and Max make progress in the investigation, but Karin and the Angel Maker continue to be one step ahead. Elsie also takes dangerous action to defend her husband Leopold.
7. Mutti
When Max discovers the truth about the secret flights, he issues an ultimatum to Moritz, and Karin and the Angel Maker organize a fatal attack on Max and Elsie's police precinct.
8. Homecoming
When Max and Elsie find out where the Angel Maker is, he has one last ruse up his sleeve; Moritz targets Tom, setting up a confrontation with Max.

Cast 

 Taylor Kitsch as Max McLaughlin, a New York Police Department Detective of partial German descent; he has come to Germany to find his brother, Moritz, and help novice German police superintendent Elise Garten to help establish a new police force in post-World War II Berlin.
 Logan Marshall-Green as Moritz McLaughlin, a United States Army soldier and Max's brother who has become mentally unstable since World War II.
 Nina Hoss as Elsie Garten, a hot-headed novice German police superintendent.
 Benjamin Sadler as Leopold Garten, Elsie's husband; currently being held prisoner in a Russian gulag.
 Tuppence Middleton as Claire Franklin, Tom’s wife and friend of Max.
Michael C. Hall as Tom Franklin, Vice-consul and Claire's husband
 Sebastian Koch as Dr. Hermann Gladow, also known as the Engelmacher ("Angel Maker"), an abortionist and crime boss who runs a crime syndicate.
 Mala Emde as Karin Mann, a woman raped by an American soldier who, after enacting revenge, is indebted to Gladow.
 Anne Ratte-Polle as Marianne, a member of Gladow's crime syndicate; something of a handler of Karin.
 Ivan G'Vera as Alexander Izosimov, a Soviet Army General detaining Leopold Garten, Elise’s husband.
 Maximilian Ehrenreich as Gad, a kind 16 year old male novice German police officer assisting Max and Elise.

Production and distribution 
The Defeated was distributed on Netflix on 18 August 2021. The series was written by Måns Mårlind, and produced by Tandem Productions and Bron Studios.

Production on The Defeated took place entirely in Prague and surrounding locations in the Czech Republic, standing in for WWII-era Germany.

Reception 
The Daily Telegraph Ed Power rated the series four out of five stars. The Sydney Morning Herald Kylie Northover rated the series three out of five stars.

References

Further reading

External links 

 

 
 
 

2020 Canadian television series debuts
2020 French television series debuts
2020 German television series debuts
Television shows set in Berlin
Television series set in 1946
2020s Canadian drama television series
2020s French drama television series
2020s German drama television series